Arthur Mason may refer to:

Arthur Mason (footballer) (1909–1971), Australian rules footballer for North Melbourne
Arthur Mason (trade unionist) (died 1933), British trade unionist
Arthur James Mason (1851–1928), English clergyman, theologian and classical scholar
Arthur John Mason (1869–1946), Australian organist and journalist
Arthur Pendleton Mason (1835–1893), American Confederate Army soldier
member of the prominent  Mason family of Virginia
Arthur T. Mason (1902–1980), United States Marine Corps general
Sir Arthur Weir Mason (1860–1924), South African judge

See also
Arthur Mason Worthington (1852–1916), English physicist and educator